NHL Centre Ice is a Canadian digital cable subscription out-of-market sports package controlled and distributed by Rogers Communications through Rogers Cable as of 2014. It is offered by three national satellite television service providers, Bell Satellite TV, TELUS Optik TV, Telus Satellite TV, and Shaw Direct and many digital cable television providers such as Eastlink, Shaw, Cogeco and more.

It offers NHL regular season and select playoff games that are played outside the local viewing area using American local and national television networks such as the Bally Sports networks and other sports networks like ABC, ESPN, and TNT/TBS. It offers both standard and high definition games.

Blackout restrictions
NHL Centre Ice does not black out any game based on attendance or mileage to said arena. All home teams are blacked out in their designated TV markets. For example, customers in Toronto cannot see Toronto Maple Leafs games on NHL Centre Ice; these local games are instead available on a local Toronto station.

This creates a significant problem in areas that lie within the blackout zone but are not served by the NHL team's regional sports network. Erie, Pennsylvania is an American example of this: Erie is in the Buffalo Sabres' blackout zone, but MSG Network is not carried in that section of Pennsylvania, thus resulting in a total blackout of all Sabres games not carried on a national provider. (When Empire Sports Network existed, that outlet did serve Erie.)

Blackouts can be lifted if one team is not televising the game and the other is, provided the non-broadcasting team grants permission. On some systems, WGN-TV Blackhawks games are not blacked out on WGN-TV in Canada even when they are playing a Canadian team even when it's the local team.

Availability
NHL Centre Ice is available with these cable and satellite providers:

 TELUS Optik TV
 TELUS Satellite TV 
 Bell Satellite TV
 Bell Aliant
 Access Communications
 Cogeco Cable
 Eastlink Cable
 Northwestel
 Rogers Cable
 Shaw Cable
 SaskTel maxTV
 Vianet
 Videotron
 Westman Communications

See also
NFL Sunday Ticket
MLB Extra Innings
NBA League Pass
NASCAR Hot Pass
ESPN College Extra
MLS Direct Kick

External links
NHL Centre Ice

Out-of-market sports packages
Satellite television
National Hockey League on television
Rogers Communications
Sportsnet